Funeral Dress, the debut album by Wussy, was released on December 6, 2005. The label, Shake It Records, released the album on CD format only.

The album received mostly positive reviews. It was chosen as the 4th greatest album of the decade by prominent critic Robert Christgau.

In 2015, SPIN ranked Funeral Dress #252 on their list of the 300 best albums of the last 30 years.

Track listing
"Airborne" – 3:17
"Funeral Dress" – 3:59
"Soak It Up" – 2:55
"Shunt" – 3:18
"Conversation Lags" – 3:08
"Crooked" – 3:13
"Humanbrained Horse" – 3:46
"Motorcycle" – 3:56
"Yellow Cotton Dress" – 2:17
"Bought It Again" – 3:44
"Don't Leave Just Now" – 3:46

Acoustic album
Wussy released an acoustic version of the album, titled Funeral Dress II, for Record Store Day on April 16, 2011, at Shake It Records in Northside, Cincinnati.

References

2006 debut albums
Wussy albums